DAZ-associated protein 2 is a protein that in humans is encoded by the DAZAP2 gene.

Function 

In mammals, the Y chromosome directs the development of the testes and plays an important role in spermatogenesis. A high percentage of infertile men have deletions that map to regions of the Y chromosome. The DAZ (deleted in azoospermia) gene cluster maps to the AZFc region and is deleted in many azoospermic and severely oligospermic men. It is thought that the Y chromosomal DAZ gene cluster arose from the transposition, amplification, and pruning of the ancestral autosomal gene DAZL. This gene encodes a RNA-binding protein with two RNP motifs that was originally identified by its interaction with the infertility factors DAZ and DAZL.

Interactions 

DAZAP2 has been shown to interact with DAZ1.

References

Further reading